Football is the popular sport, both in terms of participants and spectators, in Beijing. Beijing has several of China's significant football clubs, and the city is home to many football clubs.

Introduction

History 
Modern football passed in Beijing in the late 19th century. The football initially popular at school. in the 1940s. became well-known the Beijing football's outstanding players and more from the University. Since then. the sport gradually transition from school to society has become Beijing people read to children. Ancient China and Beijing football. modern football spread incoming three football schools in Beijing four college football talent five Beijing people read to children in football is the openness of the Beijing soccer.

Clubs 

This is a list of clubs based in Beijing sorted by which league they play in as of the 2021 season. The leagues are listed in order of their level in the Chinese football league system.

Men 
These clubs play in fully professional leagues, at levels 1–3 of the Chinese football league system.

Women

Honours 
 China Football Champions (1)
 Beijing Guoan F.C. (1)

Beijing derbies

Stadium 
 Workers' Stadium
 Beijing National Stadium
 Xiannongtan Stadium
 Beijing Fengtai Stadium
 Olympic Sports Centre (Beijing)
 Shijingshan Stadium
 Chaoyang Sports Centre

See also
Football in China

References

External links
The contemporary Beijing Football History of Jin Shan forward Genuine Mall(Chinese Edition)